Hypostomus dlouhyi is a species of catfish in the family Loricariidae. It is native to South America, where it occurs in the Yguazú River basin in the middle Paraná River drainage. The species reaches 24.5 cm (9.6 inches) SL and is believed to be a facultative air-breather.

References 

dlouhyi
Species described in 1985